Gustavo Daniel Fernández Figuerón (born 16 February 1952) is a former Uruguayan professional footballer who played as a goalkeeper. He played club football for C.A. Rentistas. He was an unused member of Uruguayan squad at 1974 FIFA World Cup and 1983 Copa América, winning the latter tournament.

References

1952 births
Living people
Uruguayan footballers
Uruguay international footballers
1974 FIFA World Cup players
Uruguayan Primera División players
La Liga players
C.A. Rentistas players
Sevilla FC players
Real Murcia players
Peñarol players
Uruguayan expatriate footballers
Expatriate footballers in Spain
Footballers from Montevideo
Association football goalkeepers